Aniceto Arce Ruiz de Mendoza (15 April 1824, in Tarija – 14 August 1906) was a Bolivian lawyer and politician who served as the 22nd president of Bolivia from 1888 to 1892. He also served as the fourth vice president of Bolivia from 1880 to 1881 under Narciso Campero. The Aniceto Arce Province is named after him.

Early life 
He was born to Diego Antonio Arce and Josefa Ruiz de Mendoza, both members of the colonial elite within the Viceroyalty of the Río de la Plata. Arce was a native of Tarija but was educated as a lawyer and resided most of his life in Sucre, where he became one of the country's foremost silver-mining tycoons.

Political life 
Arce was a supporter of José María Linares and his Constitutionalist government, even backing the President when he proclaimed himself dictator. During the Linares regime Arce began his career in Congress during, a role which he would occupy until the 1870s, when Hilarión Daza seized power.

Unlike other capable leaders of his day, Arce did not enlist to serve when the War of the Pacific developed in 1879. Indeed, his became one of the most accommodationist voices in the political spectrum, perhaps as a result of his extensive business connections to Chile, where he sold much of his silver, invested his profits, and sought financing for his projects. Arce believed that the Litoral was, for various lamentable reasons, largely indefensible. Thus, the country should cut its losses and seek an alliance with Chile rather than with Peru.

Despite this minority position, what rang more clearly in the ears of most Bolivians was Arce's steadfast call for the establishment of a conservative democratic order, with the primacy of law, regular elections, and rule by enlightened pro-business elites such as himself. To this end, he founded the Conservative Party, and participated as a candidate in the 1880 Congress that toppled General Daza, and had a role in the drafting of the country's new Constitution. Moreover, he agreed to become Narciso Campero's vice-president for the crucial, nation-building 1880-84 period.

Personal life 

Arce was married to Amalia Argandoña Revilla, the sister of Francisco Argandoña Revilla, Prince of La Glorieta. He was one of the wealthiest men in Bolivia and became a business partner of Arce. Arce would actually encourage Argandoña's marriage to Clotilde de Urioste Velasco, who the member of a powerful family from Sucre and sister of one of Arce's staunchest detractors, Atanasio de Urioste Velasco. Paradoxically, Urioste would save the life of Arce when a mob surrounded the Cathedral of Sucre and had the intention to lynch the president. Urioste disguised Arce as a priest at took him into his own home. All this despite the fact that they had completely opposite political views.

Vice President of Bolivia

Pro-Chile stance and exile 
Arce's pro-Chile stance clashed with those of the patriotic President and retired General, who favored rearmament and a sustained diplomatic offensive against Chile, perhaps leading to a mediation of the conflict and if not, to a reinsertions of Bolivian troops in Peru's aid. Arce, as explained, favored a "realistic" policy of recognition that Bolivia had indeed lost its access to the Pacific, and that the best that could be done was to reach a modus vivendi with Santiago (which had the upper hand), even if this meant abandoning the hitherto sacrosanct alliance with Lima. President Campero took this to be a sign of treason and, in 1881, expelled Arce, his own vice-president until then, from Bolivia.

Return and the elections of 1884 

Eventually, Arce's name was cleared and he was allowed to return to the country. He promptly entered his name as Conservative Party candidate in the 1884 general elections, the first under the new Constoitution and since 1873. Arce was widely expected to win too, but very narrowly lost to the "dark-horse" candidate Gregorio Pacheco, a man even wealthier than Arce and the country's chief philanthropist, who ran on a platform of apolitical "efficient administration." Being privileged silver miners from the South who shared a conservative, pro-business philosophy, the two reached an understanding, with Pacheco agreeing to become president in exchange for making Arce his vice-president and pledging himself to support the Conservative party candidate in the 1884 elections.

President of Bolivia

Administration 
As had been agreed upon, Pacheco supported Arce in the 1888 elections. It is thus that Arce, the Conservative Party caudillo, at long last became president in August 1888, at the age of 64. Even more so than Pacheco, Arce ruled repressively, but also consolidated many advances, including the completion of the first intra-Bolivian railway (leading from the Chilean border to Oruro) and the electrification of a number of Bolivian cities. He also promulgated a modern new set of banking and investment laws.

Unabashedly pro-capitalist, devoted to practically unrestricted free entrepreneurship in the English tradition, and pro-insertion into the international economy under the aegis of foreign investment, he faced many pro-Liberal rebellions but somehow managed to hold on to power by the force of his assertive personality. He completed his term and in 1892 passed the baton to another Conservative, his understudy and vice-president Mariano Baptista.

Later life and death

Retirement and the elections of 1904 
Arce retired from politics after the end of his term, although he served as an unofficial but very important adviser to the Conservative Presidents Baptista (1892–1896) and Severo Fernández (1896–99). He was forcefully returned to the political limelight at the turn of the century when he suffered political prosecution at the hands of the Liberal Party, which had at long last seized power in the Civil War of 1899.

Surprisingly, the elderly Arce was nonetheless allowed to present himself as candidate for president at the 1904 general elections. Presumably because he was 80 years old, unpopular, and therefore quite beatable. Finding the party he founded demoralized, vilified, and acephalous, the combative Arce accepted the difficult challenge of running against the officially supported, popular Liberal candidate Ismael Montes. He was trounced, losing by a wide margin—the largest in Bolivian electoral history up to that point.

Death 
The former president then finally retired completely from politics, withdrawing to his vast rural estate, where he died two years later in 1906, at the age of 82. He is best remembered for his assertive temperament and firm stance in favor of a civilian democratic (although oligarchic) order and for having laid the foundation for the functioning of a modern party system in the country.

References

1824 births
1906 deaths
19th-century Bolivian politicians
Ambassadors of Bolivia to Chile
Ambassadors of Bolivia to France
Ambassadors of Bolivia to Spain
19th-century Bolivian businesspeople
Bolivian expatriates in France
19th-century Bolivian lawyers
Bolivian people of Spanish descent
Bolivian Roman Catholics
Candidates in the 1884 Bolivian presidential election
Candidates in the 1888 Bolivian presidential election
Conservative Party (Bolivia) politicians
Government ministers of Bolivia
Finance ministers of Bolivia
People from Tarija
Presidents of Bolivia
Presidents of the Senate of Bolivia
Vice presidents of Bolivia